Labeobarbus clarkeae is a species of ray-finned fish in the  family Cyprinidae. It is endemic to Angola.

References

Endemic fauna of Angola
clarkeae
Taxa named by Keith Edward Banister
Fish described in 1984